Ladysmith is a city and the county seat of Rusk County, Wisconsin, United States. The population was 3,414 at the 2010 census.

History
The Ojibwe who travelled the Flambeau River called the area that would become Ladysmith Gakaabikijiwanan ("of cliffed rapids").

The city was founded in 1885 at the intersection of the Minneapolis, St. Paul and Sault Ste. Marie Railroad (Soo Line) with the Flambeau River, initially named Flambeau Falls. Robert Corbett, a logging and lumbering entrepreneur who was a strong influence on the city in its early years, renamed it Corbett, then Warner in 1891, and then Ladysmith on July 1, 1900, after the bride of Charles R. Smith, head of the Menasha Wooden Ware Co.

Flambeau Mine

The Flambeau Copper Mine was operated by Kennecott from 1993 to 1997. This was a very rich volcanogenic massive sulfide ore deposit, so rich that the ore was shipped directly to the smelter. Flambeau has since been closed and the site reclaimed.

2002 tornado
On September 2, 2002, a tornado rated at F3 strength destroyed much of Ladysmith's downtown area. Overall damage was estimated at $20 million, but there were no fatalities.

Geography

U.S. Highway 8 and Wisconsin Highway 27 are the main routes in the community.

Ladysmith is along the Flambeau River.

Demographics

2010 census
As of the census of 2010, there were 3,414 people, 1,527 households, and 806 families living in the city. The racial makeup of the city was 96.3% White, 0.6% African American, 0.8% Native American, 0.6% Asian, 0.5% from other races, and 1.2% from two or more races. Hispanic or Latino of any race were 1.6% of the population.

There were 1,527 households, of which 26.1% had children under the age of 18 living with them, 37.1% were married couples living together, 10.7% had a female householder with no husband present, 5.0% had a male householder with no wife present, and 47.2% were non-families. 41.7% of all households were made up of individuals, and 20.2% had someone living alone who was 65 years of age or older. The average household size was 2.14 and the average family size was 2.86.

The median age in the city was 43.8 years. 22.3% of residents were under the age of 18; 7% were between the ages of 18 and 24; 21.9% were from 25 to 44; 25.7% were from 45 to 64; and 23% were 65 years of age or older. The gender makeup of the city was 45.6% male and 54.4% female.

2000 census
As of the census of 2000, there were 3,932 people, 1,570 households, and 916 families living in the city. The population density was 1,008.9 people per square mile (389.3/km2). There were 1,660 housing units at an average density of 425.9 per square mile (164.3/km2). The racial makeup of the city was 96.31% White, 1.48% African American, 0.56% Native American, 0.48% Asian, 0.13% Pacific Islander, 0.10% from other races, and 0.94% from two or more races. Hispanic or Latino of any race were 0.76% of the population.

There were 1,570 households, out of which 28.2% had children under the age of 18 living with them, 43.4% were married couples living together, 11.0% had a female householder with no husband present, and 41.6% were non-families. 35.8% of all households were made up of individuals, and 19.2% had someone living alone who was 65 years of age or older. The average household size was 2.25 and the average family size was 2.92.

In the city, the population was spread out, with 22.8% under the age of 18, 13.4% from 18 to 24, 23.7% from 25 to 44, 18.7% from 45 to 64, and 21.4% who were 65 years of age or older. The median age was 37 years. For every 100 females there were 87.4 males. For every 100 females age 18 and over, there were 83.3 males.

The median income for a household in the city was $28,274, and the median income for a family was $40,526. Males had a median income of $26,725 versus $20,826 for females. The per capita income for the city was $15,499. About 7.2% of families and 12.2% of the population were below the poverty line, including 11.1% of those under age 18 and 11.0% of those age 65 or over.

Transportation
Rusk County Airport (KRCX) serves Ladysmith.

The Rusk County Transit Commission provides transportation within Rusk County.

Education
Ladysmith is served by the Ladysmith School District, which administers Ladysmith High School and Ladysmith Elementary School. Ladysmith is also home to private schools Our Lady of Sorrows, a Catholic grade school, and North Cedar Academy, a private college prep International boarding high school, providing "BluGold" study program, which allows students to earn up to 60 college credits within the high school. 

Ladysmith was the home of Mount Senario College, which closed in 2002. In the 2006–07 school year, part of the former campus was operated as Concordia Preparatory School, a private Christian high school. That institution also faced financial problems and closed. Silver Lake College of Manitowoc, Wisconsin, began offering courses at Mount Senario, renamed Mount Senario Education Center, in September 2009. Silver Lake itself closed in 2020, and North Cedar Academy now occupies Mount Senario's old campus, passed on its collaboration with the UW System and provides "BluGold" Guarantee Transfer Program.

Notable people

 Gary Beecham, artist
 Lois Capps, member of the United States House of Representatives from California
 Jorge A. Carow, Wisconsin State Assembly
 Mark Hayes, composer and arranger
 Donald J. Hoffman, Air Force 4-star general
 Ron Kovic, author, Vietnam War veteran
 Jim Leonhard, NFL player
 Earl Maves, NFL player
 A. R. Morlan (1958–2016), author
 Martin Reynolds, mayor of Ladysmith, Wisconsin State Assembly
 Kathleen Slattery-Moschkau, filmmaker

See also
 List of cities in Wisconsin

References

External links

 City of Ladysmith
 Ladysmith Chamber of Commerce
 Ladysmith, Wisconsin is at coordinates . 
 Sanborn fire insurance maps:  1902 1909 1914

Cities in Wisconsin
Cities in Rusk County, Wisconsin
County seats in Wisconsin